Ervin Hunt is a former defensive back in the National Football League.

Biography
Hunt was born Ervin Jacob Hunt on July 1, 1947 in Fowler, California.
He graduated from Thomas Alva Edison High School in Fresno California in 1965.

Career
Hunt was drafted by the Green Bay Packers in the sixth round of the 1970 NFL Draft and played that season with the team. He played at the collegiate level at California State University, Fresno.

See also
List of Green Bay Packers players

References

1947 births
Living people
People from Fowler, California
Green Bay Packers players
American football defensive backs
Fresno State Bulldogs football players
Players of American football from California
Sportspeople from Fresno County, California